Girls on the Avenue is the second studio album by Australian rock music singer-songwriter, Richard Clapton, which was released in April 1975. It peaked at number 33 on the Kent Music Report Albums Chart. It provided two singles, "Girls on the Avenue" (1975) and "Down the Road" (June 1975). The title track reached number 4 on the related Singles Chart. It was originally released as the B-side of "I'm Travelling Down the Castlereagh", after considerable radio play, it was named as the A-side. The album was produced by Richard Batchens who later produced albums for the Australian band Sherbet, and was released on CD in 1990.

At the 1975 Australian Record Awards, the album won Male Vocal Album.

Reception 

In May 1975 Tony Catterall of The Canberra Times felt Girls on the Avenue showed that Clapton was, "suffering from a case of rock schizophrenia: he can't make up his mind whether to be himself, or Australia's answer to Van Morrison... [he's] better off being himself and stick to his fine, gentle rock with his distinctive, melodic voice because it's on tracks, like the title cut where he's at his best... [He] is capable of writing above average lyrics when he's working from his own travelling experiences, [but] when he tries to extrapolate too far from them he falls into banalities that are only made worse by a singing style intended to make them sound profound."

Australian rock music journalist, Ed Nimmervoll, observed that, "Almost universally [the title track] was assumed that his song was a sympathetic ode to street walkers... Girls on the Avenue, the song and the album, assured that [Clapton] had Australia's attention from now on. The rest of the album's songs revisited the themes on [his] first album... [The second album's cover] saw Richard depicted with what appeared to be the heroines of his song. One really was!"

Track listing

Personnel 

Band Members
 Richard Clapton – guitar, lead vocals
 Red McKelvie – lead guitar
 Brian Bethell – bass guitar
 Tony Ansell – keyboards
 Dave Ovendon – drums

Production 
 Richard Batchens – engineer, producer at Festival Studio 24, Sydney

Charts

Release history

References 

Richard Clapton albums
Festival Records albums
Infinity Records albums
1975 albums
Albums produced by Richard Batchens